The term four piper, also known as a four stacker, is United States Navy terminology for classes of destroyers with four funnels. These include the  classes listed below:

 
 
 
 

These classes were built for use by the United States Navy during World War I and subsequently "moth-balled". Fifty were loaned, under the Destroyers-for-bases_deal to the United Kingdom when convoy escorts were desperately needed in the early years of World War II.

References

External links
 Four Piper Destroyer Organization, 2005, "General Specifications"

Ship types